Flax fletcheri is a moth of the family Erebidae first described by Michael Fibiger in 2011. It is found on Guadalcanal in the Solomon Islands.

The forewings (including fringes) are beige, with brown subterminal and terminal areas. The base of the costa and the medial area are also brown with a dark-brown dot in the inner lower area. The crosslines are beige. The terminal line is only indicated by dark-brown interveinal dots. The hindwings are light grey. The underside of the forewings are unicolorous brown and the underside of the hindwings is grey with a discal spot.

References

Micronoctuini
Moths described in 2011
Taxa named by Michael Fibiger